The Palm Valley Bridge spans the Intracoastal Waterway in the Palm Valley area near Ponte Vedra Beach, Florida. It is located on County Road 210 in St. Johns County. In 2002, the old two-lane drawbridge was replaced with a fixed, clear span, four-lane bridge. Ground-breaking was in December 2000 and the official ribbon cutting ceremony was held in July 2002. The Palm Valley Bridge was built due to increasing traffic on the bridge and population growth in the area.

See also
List of bridges documented by the Historic American Engineering Record in Florida

References

External links

Intracoastal Waterway
Bridges completed in 2002
Historic American Engineering Record in Florida
Road bridges in Florida
2002 establishments in Florida